In 1820, Vermont returned to using districts. This would be the only election in which the  would be used.

Vermont elected its members September 5, 1820.  A majority was required for election, which was not met in the 2nd or 3rd district, requiring additional ballots to achieve a majority. The 2nd district required 7 ballots. The 3rd district required two additional ballots.  The additional ballots were held December 11, 1820, and February 19, May 1, July 2, September 4, and October 22, 1821.

See also 
 1820 and 1821 United States House of Representatives elections
 List of United States representatives from Vermont

1820
Vermont
Vermont
United States House of Representatives
United States House of Representatives